Philodromus buxi is a spider species found from Europe to Kazakhstan.

See also 
 List of Philodromidae species

References

External links 

buxi
Invertebrates of Central Asia
Spiders of Europe
Spiders of Asia
Spiders described in 1884